Qap Qoli (also Romanized as Qāp Qolī; also known as Qāpī Qolī) is a village in Zamkan Rural District, in the Central District of Salas-e Babajani County, Kermanshah Province, Iran. At the 2006 census, its population was 168, in 40 families.

References 

Populated places in Salas-e Babajani County